"20 Hours in America" is the two-part fourth season premiere of The West Wing. The episode aired on September 25, 2002 on NBC.

Plot

The episode opens with President Josiah Bartlet giving a speech in Indiana during his re-election campaign, while Toby and Josh converse in a field with a farmer named Cathy (played by Amy Adams). They realize that the Presidential motorcade that was transporting them between campaign stops has gone without them, leaving them, along with Donna who was sent to fetch them, stranded. Much of the episode deals with the trio's attempts to get home; however, their journey is delayed by several mishaps (Cathy's truck runs out of biodiesel, they miss their plane due to confusion over Indiana's time zones, they board the wrong train, etc.)

As their journey continues and Josh and Toby debate campaign strategy (eventually concluding that the election should be about the voters' everyday concerns, and not about Bartlet vs. Ritchie), the three of them are exposed to the culture of rural Indiana.  Josh and Toby remain largely oblivious to the problems of the people around them, until they meet Matt Kelley, an affable man in a bar who is concerned about how he's going to pay for his daughter's college tuition.  This sets into motion a storyline that continues across later episodes, as Josh and Toby, inspired by their conversation with Matt, later spearhead an attempt to make tuition tax deductible.

Meanwhile, an exhausted and overworked Sam Seaborn is supposed to be taking the day off for some much-needed sleep, but Josh instead enlists him to staff the President until they return from their escapade in Indiana. Sam is eventually left with a new appreciation for the intelligence Josh must use on a daily basis.

At the White House, the President deals with minor crises both home and abroad:  A dip in the stock market makes the President superstitious about meeting a man who met with President Hoover just before the stock market crash of '29, and the President later receives news that the Qumar Government is to reopen an inquiry into the disappearance of the Defense Minister's plane, which was destroyed by U.S. agents in a covert assassination ordered by President Bartlet. Increasingly concerned, the President is nonetheless reassured by Admiral Fitzwallace that they have successfully covered their tracks.  Qumar, however, falsely claims that it has found an Israeli Air Force parachute, in an attempt to provoke a military confrontation with Israel through a false flag operation. Fitzwallace and Leo McGarry agree that they cannot exonerate Israel and denounce the false evidence without admitting their own culpability.

Meanwhile, C.J. approaches Charlie about taking over Simon's role as a big brother to a young black man, Anthony, who has started to act up as a way to cope with Simon's death. Charlie is at first unwilling to lend his limited free time to volunteer, but when Anthony lashes out at C.J., Charlie has a dramatic change of heart.

Later in the episode, a report comes in that two pipe bombs have exploded during a college swim meet, killing 44 people and injuring over 100. Everyone is shaken by this event, but it inspires Sam to write a powerfully uplifting speech, which the President delivers to great effect.  Part of the content of this speech is actually spoken by Bartlet earlier in the first episode. Bruno Gianelli refers to Sam as a 'freak' for being able to write the most moving portion of the speech during the ride to the event.

Plagiarism incident
On May 6, 2006, NBC Sports aired a special program before the Kentucky Derby that plagiarized two passages from the speech that Sam writes for the President following the explosion of the pipe bombs in "20 Hours in America, Part II".  The freelance writer responsible for the plagiarism was fired.

References

External links
 
 

The West Wing (season 4) episodes
2002 American television episodes
Television episodes set in Indiana